Axel Mackenrott (6 September 1969 in Hamburg, Germany) is the keyboard player for the heavy metal band Masterplan.

Axel began playing at around 11 years of age with piano lessons, and went on to eventually acquire a Bachelor of Arts in musical sciences. In his early career he played in many small-time bands and cover bands, before he was invited to play keyboards on tour with Gamma Ray. His career began to gather momentum when he was brought into the power metal supergroup Masterplan, shortly after the recordings for their debut album were completed.

In 2005 Axel also joined Beautiful Sin, the side project of his Masterplan bandmate Uli Kusch, and he performed as a guest musician on Megadeth's 2007 album United Abominations.

On Masterplan 2010 album Time to Be King, Axel had a major contribution being one of the main three songwriters along with guitarist Roland Grapow and singer Jørn Lande.

On Masterplan 2013 album Novum Initium, Axel and Roland Grapow remained the only members from the original line-up of Masterplan, fixing the partnership as the main songwriters of the band.

Discography

Masterplan
 Back for My Life EP (2004)
 Aeronautics (2005)
 Lost and Gone EP (2007)
 MK II (2007)
 Far From the End of the World EP (2010)
 Time to Be King (2010)
 Novum Initium (2013)

Beautiful Sin
 The Unexpected (2006)

Aussenborder "Niemand da" ( 2007 )

Gamma Ray
Skeletons in the Closet (Live album) (2003)

Megadeth
 United Abominations (2007)

References
Encyclopaedia Metallum: Masterplan

German keyboardists
German heavy metal musicians
Musicians from Hamburg
Living people
1969 births
Masterplan (band) members